Bruno Lenz (8 November 1911 – 16 June 2006) was a German painter and violinist. He was assistant concertmaster for 20 years of the Bavarian Radio Symphony Orchestra.

Life 
Lenz came from a family of teachers. He was born in 1911 as son of the main teacher Otto Lenz in Bollenbach (today Haslach im Kinzigtal) in the Black Forest. He received his first violin lessons in Freiburg im Breisgau. During the summer months from 1920 to 1924, Jules Siber was his teacher in the Kinzig valley. Besides his musical talent he developed a devotion to visual arts at an early age. In 1924, he made his first portrait drawings. After his Abitur in 1925 at the Realgymnasium, he was encouraged in painting and drawing by Theodor Schück and in music by Otfried Nies from 1926 on. In 1933, he was given painting lessons by Otto Vittali and Arthur Braun, with Julius Bissier exerting a decisive influence on him.

Lenz studied violin with Gösta Andrasson in Basel and with Georg Kulenkampff and Max Strub in Berlin. He also appeared as a soloist and chamber musician (Bruno Lenz Piano Trio, Lenz Quartet). In 1937, he took over the violin training classes at the Hochschule für Musik Freiburg, until he was called up for the Wehrmacht in 1940.

In 1947, he took part in the Permanent Swabian Art Exhibition and in the Schaezlerpalais at the 11th Art Exhibition. In 1950, he exhibited at the Städtische Galerie im Lenbachhaus in Munich as part of "Augsburger und Schwäbische Maler". In 1957, he had a solo exhibition at the Wolfgang Gurlitt Gallery. In 1959, he took part in the "Great Art Exhibition" at the Haus der Kunst. In 1983 he received an invitation to the Villa Massimo in Rome. He realised further exhibitions in Offenburg and Konstanz.

In 1950, he was offered a position as a professional musician in Munich. For 20 years he was deputy concertmaster of the Symphonieorchester des Bayerischen Rundfunks under Eugen Jochum and Rafael Kubelik.

The "Bruno-Lenz-Foundation" was established in 2008. Some of his paintings were donated to the city of Haslach, where they are exhibited in the "Haus der Musik". In addition, a street in his home town in the district of Bollenbach was named after him, the Bruno-Lenz-Straße.

From 1939, Lenz was married to the musician Anne-Marie Fiedler and had two children.

Further reading 
 Ilse Konell (ed.): Jules Siber, Paganinis Wiederkehr. Ein Leben für die Kunst. Orphil-Verlag, Niebüll 2003, .

References

External links 
 
 

German portrait painters
German classical violinists
1911 births
2006 deaths
People from Haslach im Kinzigtal